Interchange Hintham (Dutch: Knooppunt Hintham) is a three-way interchange near Hintham, Netherlands. It is a stack interchange of the A2 motorway (E25) and the A59 motorway (N93). It was previously a trumpet interchange.

Road interchanges in the Netherlands
Motorways in the Netherlands
Motorways in North Brabant
Transport in 's-Hertogenbosch